Maritsa Municipality (obshtina) is located in the Plovdiv Province, southern Bulgaria on the northern bank of the Maritsa River. It has 30,676 inhabitants and consists only of villages. The municipality has thriving industry with around €400 000 000 invested in the recent years. Its administrative center is Plovdiv but the city is not part of the municipality.

Religion 
According to the latest Bulgarian census of 2011, the religious composition, among those who answered the optional question on religious identification, was the following:

Villages in the Maritsa municipality
Benkovski
Dink
Graf Ignatievo
Kalekovets
Kostievo
Krislovo
Manole
Manolsko Konare
Radinovo
Rogosh
Skutare
Stroevo
Trilistnik
Trud
Tsaratsovo
Voivodinovo
Voisil
Yasno Pole
Zhelyazno

Footnotes